Brinkman is a surname.

Brinkman may also refer to:
Former name of Royal Brinkman, a horticultural company
Brinkman, Oklahoma, a rural community in Oklahoma, USA
Brinkman v. Miami University
Brinkmann, Córdoba, Argentina